is a private university in Kobe, Hyōgo, Japan. The predecessor of the school was founded in 1963, and it was chartered as a university in 1968. 
In 1995 the school relocated from its original building in Kobe and moved to a newer building on the man-made island, Rokkō Island.

External links
 Official website 

Educational institutions established in 1963
Private universities and colleges in Japan
Universities and colleges in Hyōgo Prefecture
Anglican Church in Japan
1963 establishments in Japan
Kansai Collegiate American Football League
Christian universities and colleges in Japan